Pre-1927 Route 4 was a route in New Jersey that ran from Absecon north to Rahway, existing from 1916 to 1927. Today, it is part of the following routes:
 U.S. Route 9 in New Jersey
 New Jersey Route 88
 New Jersey Route 35
 New Jersey Route 71
 New Jersey Route 35

U.S. Route 9
04 (pre-1927)